Adam Offord Buxton (born 7 June 1969) is an English actor, comedian, podcaster and writer. With the filmmaker Joe Cornish, he is part of the comedy duo Adam and Joe. They presented the Channel 4 television series The Adam and Joe Show (1996–2001) and the BBC Radio 6 Music series Adam and Joe (2007–2009, 2011).

Buxton has produced music videos, including several collaborations with the band Radiohead. In 2015, he launched The Adam Buxton Podcast, in which he interviews comedians, authors, musicians, and celebrities. He has appeared on panel shows including Would I Lie To You?, Never Mind the Buzzcocks, and 8 Out of 10 Cats Does Countdown.

Early life and education 
Buxton was born on 7 June 1969 in Shepherd's Bush, London, and spent some of his childhood in Wales. His father was the travel writer and wine critic Nigel Buxton, who later appeared  on The Adam and Joe Show as "Baaad Dad". Adam's mother, Valerie (née Birrell), was Chilean.

Buxton was educated at Windlesham House School in Pulborough, West Sussex, then Westminster School, London. At Westminster, he befriended his future comedy partner Joe Cornish and the future documentarian Louis Theroux. He attended the University of Warwick for two terms before dropping out to study sculpture at Cheltenham College of Art.

Career

With Joe Cornish

Buxton's first television appearance was in an episode of Channel 4's Takeover TV. In 1995, he hosted the show itself. Buxton and Joe Cornish formed the comedy duo Adam and Joe, and with the production company World of Wonder created The Adam and Joe Show for Channel 4. It ran for four series from 1996 to 2001. In 1999, The Adam and Joe Book, a spin-off book written by Buxton and Cornish, was published. Buxton and Cornish presented radio shows on Xfm and later BBC Radio 6 Music, which won a Silver Sony Award for Best Entertainment Programme in 2012.

Solo work

Buxton co-wrote and acted in the Channel 4 mini-series The Last Chancers, broadcast in December 2004. In 2005, he performed character-driven comedy at the 2005 Edinburgh Festival, with a show entitled I, Pavel, for which he grew a large beard.

Buxton appeared as a future version of himself in the BBC Two comedy series Time Trumpet, which began a six-part series in August 2006. In 2007, he portrayed journalist Tim Messenger in Edgar Wright's film Hot Fuzz. He has also appeared in the film Stardust, covering for Noel Fielding, who was ill at the time of production. Buxton appeared in the BBC Three comedy sketch show Rush Hour, which premièred on 19 March 2007.

Buxton has collaborated on several occasions with the band Radiohead. He assisted with a 2007 webcast from their studio, co-directed the videos for their 2008 singles "Jigsaw Falling into Place" and "Nude", and created a video vignette for their 2016 album A Moon Shaped Pool. In January 2010, he appeared in the BBC comedy The Persuasionists. He also featured in the 2007 film Son of Rambow as a teacher. Buxton released a number of videos on YouTube, and was commissioned to produce a pilot programme for the BBC based around work of this kind. This was broadcast as MeeBOX on BBC Three in June 2008, but a full series was not commissioned. He guest-starred in the 2011 film The External World by David O'Reilly.

In July 2012, Buxton appeared in a TV version of his tour Bug on Sky Atlantic, Adam Buxton's BUG. He started performing the show in 2007, and has continued to tour the Bug show as well as hosting it regularly at the BFI in London. He is the narrator of some books available on the Ladybird Classic Me Books iPad app, including "Goldilocks and the Three Bears" and "Three Little Pigs". He has since narrated several other titles on the Me Books app such as The Great Explorer, The Brave Beast and The Lonely Beast by children's illustrator and author Chris Judge. He also appeared in the Doctor Who audio drama The One Doctor by Big Finish Productions.

Buxton has made appearances on Have I Got News for You, Never Mind the Buzzcocks, The IT Crowd, Don't Watch That, Watch This and Look Around You among others. He was also a panellist with Jonathan Ross for the Big Fat Quiz of the '80s. Buxton has guest starred in several episodes of the comedy gameshow mash-up 8 Out of 10 Cats Does Countdown featuring in Dictionary Corner. In 2015 Buxton became the voice of Messy for children's TV animation Messy Goes to Okido, which aired on 7 September 2015 on CBeebies. In 2017 Buxton made regular cameo appearances as "Jarhead" in the revamped version of The Crystal Maze. He appeared in the video game Lego City Undercover for Nintendo's Wii U and the Illumination film Sing 2.

Buxton released the audiobook version of his autobiography, Ramble Book, in April 2020, published by HarperCollins. He provided voice acting roles for the Cartoon Network pilot Beetle + Bean.

The Adam Buxton Podcast

Since September 2015, Buxton has produced The Adam Buxton Podcast, in which he interviews cultural figures including comedians, writers and musicians. The first series went out weekly in 2015 before a Christmas episode with Joe Cornish, in the style of their BBC Radio 6 show. Guests have included Louis Theroux, Joe Cornish and Charlie Brooker, as well as other public figures such as Jon Ronson, Caitlin Moran, Michael Palin and Brian Eno. It won Best Online Comedy Talk Show at the Online Radio Awards, Podcast Champion at the British Podcast Awards and the Internet Award from Chortle.

Personal life
Buxton married Sarah Evans-Lombe in 2001. They live near Norwich with their three children.

References

External links
Official site and blog
Adam Buxton on YouTube

 
Fame: 60 Seconds – Adam Buxton – Andrew Williams, Metro (2008)

1969 births
Living people
20th-century English comedians
20th-century English male actors
21st-century English comedians
21st-century English male actors
Alumni of the University of Gloucestershire
Alumni of the University of Warwick
British actors of Latin American descent
British people of Chilean descent
Comedians from London
English male comedians
English male film actors
English male television actors
English male voice actors
English people of Chilean descent
English podcasters
Male actors from London
People educated at Westminster School, London
People educated at Windlesham House School